Byron Nieto (born 3 February 1998) is a Chilean footballer who plays for Universidad Católica on loan from Club Deportes Antofagasta

References

1998 births
Living people
Chilean footballers
Chilean Primera División players
C.D. Antofagasta footballers
Association football midfielders
People from Santiago Province, Chile